Sankari is a village in Khandaghosh CD block in Bardhaman Sadar South subdivision of the Purba Bardhaman district in West Bengal, India.

Geography
There are four paras (neighbourhoods) in the village. There are five big and some small ponds. Sankari used to be called Basudebpur; its current name reflects the village's temple of Sankari goddess. Khudkuri is a neighbouring village. It is 15 km away from Burdwan.

Demographics
As per the 2011 Census of India Shankrai had a total population of 4,776 of which 2,436 (51%) were males and 2,340 (49%) were females. Population below 6 years was 500. The total number of literates in Shankrai was 3,228 (75.49% of the population over 6 years).

Education
Sankrai Primary School, a coeducational institution, is affiliated with the West Bengal Board of Secondary Education. It  is also affiliated with West Bengal Council of Higher Secondary Education.

Healthcare
There is a primary health centre at Khudkuri, PO Sankrai (with 4 beds), located nearby.

References 

Villages in Purba Bardhaman district